Božidar Kolaković (Cyrillic: Божидар Колаковић; 8 December 1929 – 17 October 2010) was a footballer most notably with FK Partizan and the Yugoslav national team.

International career
He made his debut for Yugoslavia in a February 1951 friendly match away against France, which remained his sole international appearance.

References

External links
 
 

1929 births
2010 deaths
People from Sisak
Yugoslav emigrants to Germany
Association football defenders
Yugoslav footballers
Yugoslavia international footballers
NK Lokomotiva Zagreb players
FK Partizan players
NK Osijek players
FK Hajduk Kula players
Yugoslav First League players